Walter Matthews may refer to:
 Walter Matthews (politician) (1900–1986), member of the Canadian House of Commons
 Walter Matthews (priest) (1881–1973), British Anglican priest, Dean of St Paul's Cathedral
 Walt Matthews (1934–2014), baseball player for Houston Astros
 Wal Matthews (1894–1973), Australian rules footballer for South Melbourne

See also
 Walter Mathews (disambiguation)